"Me and Julio Down by the Schoolyard" is a song by American singer-songwriter Paul Simon. It was the second single from his second, self-titled studio album (1972), released on Columbia Records.

Lyrical subject

The song is about two boys ("Me and Julio") who have broken a law, although the exact law that has been broken is not stated in the song. When "the mama pajama" finds out what they have done, she goes to the police station to report the crime. The individuals are later arrested, but released when a "radical priest" intervenes.

The meaning and references in the song have long provoked debate. In a July 20, 1972 interview for Rolling Stone, Jon Landau asked Simon: "What is it that the mama saw? The whole world wants to know." Simon replied "I have no idea what it is... Something sexual is what I imagine, but when I say 'something', I never bothered to figure out what it was. Didn't make any difference to me."

More recently, in October 2010, Simon described the song as "a bit of inscrutable doggerel", while the "radical priest" has been interpreted as a reference to Daniel Berrigan, who was featured on the cover of Time on January 25, 1971, near when the song was written.

The song mentions "Rosie, the queen of Corona", referring to Corona, a neighborhood in Queens near where Simon grew up.

Recording 
The percussion sound in the song, unusual for American pop, was created with a cuica, a Brazilian friction drum instrument often used in samba music.

Video
In 1988, Simon released a video for the song to promote his greatest hits compilation Negotiations and Love Songs. The video was filmed at Mathews-Palmer Park in Hell's Kitchen, which was standing in for Halsey Junior High School in Forest Hills, Queens, the neighborhood in which Simon grew up and met Art Garfunkel in high school. Many of the children featured in the video were from that same school; Kia Jeffries, who sang on Simon's The Rhythm of the Saints album and cast the video, had attended as well.

It features an introduction by hip hop MC's (and then-fellow Warner Bros. Records label mates) Big Daddy Kane and Biz Markie. Main Source member Large Professor also makes a cameo towards the end. The video depicts adults interacting with the youth of an inner-city schoolyard. It shows Simon playing basketball and stickball with the children, and it also features basketball player Spud Webb, baseball player Mickey Mantle, and football coach-commentator John Madden giving tips to young athletes.

Personnel
 Paul Simon – vocals, acoustic guitar, whistling
 David Spinozza – acoustic guitar
 Airto Moreira – percussion
 Russell George – bass guitar

Cover versions 
German singer Peter Rainford covered the song in 1973, releasing the single entitled as "Lady Pyjama" in Germany and The Netherlands. It was translated into German and arranged by Uli Roever.

Performances by other artists 
Simon and Garfunkel performed the song as a duet during their 1981 benefit concert in Central Park; this version also appears on the live album of the concert that was released in 1982, The Concert in Central Park.
The punk rock cover band Me First and the Gimme Gimmes covered "Me and Julio" on their 1997 album, Have a Ball.
The male a cappella group Voice Male covered it on their 1997 album "Up, Up, and Away".
New York singer/songwriter Jesse Malin covered this song on his April 7, 2008 covers album On Your Sleeve.
Grant-Lee Phillips covered the song in an episode of Gilmore Girls.
It appears on Streetlight Manifesto's cover album, 99 Songs of Revolution: Volume 1.
A version of the song was included on a compilation of Arthur Fiedler and the Boston Pops Orchestra titled Greatest Hits of the '70s.
 New York Voices covered the song on their album The Songs of Paul Simon.
Jack Antonoff performed this song for the soundtrack to the animated film The Secret Life of Pets 2.

In popular culture
The song appears in a montage in the 2001 film The Royal Tenenbaums directed by filmmaker Wes Anderson. It also appears in the film A Home at the End of the World, over the opening credits of Maid in Manhattan, in The Simpsons episode "Holidays of Future Passed", within the film The Muppets, and in the trailer for Missing Link.

In 1977, Simon himself performed the song on Sesame Street, along with a girl who backed him up singing "Dance dance dance all right/dance dance dance all right/Everybody dance," etc.

The song plays in the second episode of Saturday Night Live, during a Weekend Update segment where Simon plays basketball. It was also featured in an SNL skit paying homage to Wes Anderson as a trailer of a horror movie (titled The Midnight Coterie of Sinister Intruders) in his distinct style.

In 2012 the song played in the Napoleon Dynamite TV show. Season 1 Episode 6.

Simon performed the song with Stephen Colbert on the September 11, 2015 episode of The Late Show.

Charts

Weekly charts

Year-end charts

Certifications

Notes

References

Sources

External links
 

1972 singles
Paul Simon songs
Songs written by Paul Simon
Song recordings produced by Roy Halee
Song recordings produced by Paul Simon
Columbia Records singles